Hermann Buhl (31 May 1935 – 22 March 2014) was a German middle-distance runner. He competed in the men's 3000 metres steeplechase at the 1960 Summer Olympics.

References

1935 births
2014 deaths
Athletes (track and field) at the 1960 Summer Olympics
German male middle-distance runners
German male steeplechase runners
Olympic athletes of the United Team of Germany
Place of birth missing
20th-century German people